The Interior Minister in the Gaza Strip is an office created in June 2007, following the Hamas takeover of the Gaza Strip, that left the Palestinian Authority (PA) in control only of the West Bank and Hamas in control of the Gaza Strip. The office is in charge of the security and statistics of the people in the Gaza Strip.

In June 2007, the Interior Minister in Gaza was Said Seyam, as part of the first Hamas government of June 2007 led by Ismail Haniyeh. After Seyam was assassinated in January 2009, during the Gaza War, Fathi Hamad was appointed to the office in April 2009. Hamad continued in the position in the second  Haniyeh government of September 2012.

The Interior Minister also leads the Hamas Public Affairs Department and is the director of Al-Aqsa TV, the Hamas-run television station.

Interior Ministers (Gaza Strip)

See also 
Interior Minister of the Palestinian Authority

External links
Official Interior Ministry Website (Gaza Strip)

References 

Government ministers of the Gaza Strip